Green Hill is an unincorporated community in Wetzel County, West Virginia, United States. Green Hill is located east of New Martinsville.

References

Unincorporated communities in Wetzel County, West Virginia
Unincorporated communities in West Virginia